The 2021–2023 ICC World Test Championship is the second edition of the ICC World Test Championship of Test cricket. It started on 4 August 2021 and is scheduled to finish with the Final on 7–11 June at The Oval, London.

The five-match Pataudi Trophy between England and India, started 4 August 2021, began the second cycle of the World Test Championship. That series, along with the Ashes in December 2021, were the only two series comprising five Tests in the second WTC cycle. New Zealand were the defending champions. In September 2022, the International Cricket Council (ICC) announced that the final of this edition of the World Test Championship would be played at The Oval in June 2023.

Format 
The tournament was played played over two years, with 69 matches over 27 series scheduled for the league stage from which the top two teams advanced to a final. Each team was scheduled to play six series, with three at home and three away. Each series consisted of two to five Test matches. Each participant played between 12 and 22 matches. Each match was scheduled for a duration of five days.

Points system
The points system was changed from the previous edition. In this edition, 12 points would be available each match regardless of how many matches there were in a series. A win was worth all 12 points, a tie was worth 6 points each, a draw was worth 4 points each, and a loss was worth 0 points. A team that was behind the required over rate at the end of a match would have one point deducted for each over it was behind. As in the previous edition, teams were ranked in the league table based on percentage of total points won out of total points contested.

Participants 
The nine full members of the ICC who participated were:

 
 
 
 
 
 
 
 
 

Countries had test status not participated:

Schedule 
The schedule for the World Test Championship was announced by the International Cricket Council (ICC) on 20 June 2018, as part of the 2018–2023 Future Tours Programme. Rather than being a full round-robin tournament in which everyone played everyone else equally, each team played only six of the other eight, as in the previous cycle.

League table 

  Teams qualified for final
 The top two teams advanced to the final.

League stage

2021

Pataudi Trophy (England v India)

West Indies v Pakistan

2021–22

Sobers–Tissera Trophy (Sri Lanka v West Indies)

India v New Zealand

Bangladesh v Pakistan

The Ashes (Australia v England)

The Freedom Series (South Africa v India)

New Zealand v Bangladesh

New Zealand v South Africa

India v Sri Lanka

Benaud-Qadir Trophy (Pakistan v Australia)

Benaud-Qadir Trophy (Pakistan v Australia)

Richards–Botham Trophy (West Indies v England)

South Africa v Bangladesh

2022

Bangladesh v Sri Lanka

England v New Zealand

West Indies v Bangladesh

Warne–Muralitharan Trophy (Sri Lanka v Australia)

Sri Lanka v Pakistan

Basil D'Oliveira Trophy (England v South Africa)

2022–23

Frank Worrell Trophy (Australia v West Indies)

Pakistan v England

Bangladesh v India

Australia v South Africa

Pakistan v New Zealand

Border–Gavaskar Trophy (India v Australia)

Sir Vivian Richards Trophy (South Africa v West Indies)

New Zealand v Sri Lanka

Final

Statistics

Individual statistics
The top 5 players in each category are listed.

Most runs

Most wickets

Most dismissals for a wicket-keeper

Highest individual score

Best bowling figures in an innings

Best bowling figures in a match

Best batting averages

Best bowling averages

Team statistics

Highest team totals

Lowest team totals

Highest successful run-chases

Final standings

See also
 Test cricket
 ICC Men's Test Team Rankings
 2020–2023 ICC Cricket World Cup Super League
 2021 ICC Men's T20 World Cup

Notes

References

External links 
 Official website
 Tournament home on ESPNcricinfo

ICC World Test Championship
Test cricket competitions
ICC World Test Championship
ICC World Test Championship
ICC World Test Championship
Current cricket seasons